Opus IV may refer to:

 Opus IV (album), a 1996 album by Abigor
 Opus IV (film), a 1925 film